Théo Gmür (born 8 August 1996) is an alpine skier who won gold for Switzerland in the standing division of Alpine skiing at the 2018 Winter Paralympics – Men's downhill. He has cerebral palsy.

He won the bronze medal in the men's downhill standing event at the 2022 Winter Paralympics held in Beijing, China.

References

External links 
 

1996 births
Living people
Swiss male alpine skiers
Paralympic alpine skiers of Switzerland
Paralympic gold medalists for Switzerland
Paralympic bronze medalists for Switzerland
Paralympic medalists in alpine skiing
Alpine skiers at the 2018 Winter Paralympics
Alpine skiers at the 2022 Winter Paralympics
Medalists at the 2018 Winter Paralympics
Medalists at the 2022 Winter Paralympics
Sportspeople with cerebral palsy
21st-century Swiss people